On a firearm or other tools, a pistol grip is a distinctly protruded handle underneath the main mechanism, to be held by the user's hand at a more vertical (and thus more ergonomic) angle, similar to the how one would hold a conventional pistol.

In firearms, the pistol grip is located behind the trigger and generally held by the hand that operates the trigger. Rifles and shotguns without pistol grips are generally referred to as having "straight" or "upland" (shotguns only) style stocks.  Some firearms, starting from a 1840s Belgian carbine, and most automatic weapons in the 20th century (e. g., Chauchat MG,  Thompson submachine gun, AK-47 assault rifle), have a second frontal pistol grip (or foregrip) on the firearm's fore-end to be used by the support hand for better stability in operation.

Pistol grips can also serve multiple functions, such as a magazine housing (in semi-automatic pistols), bipod (in some foregrips) or tool storage device (for spare batteries, gun oil/cleaner, hex keys, etc).  In few firearms, like the Finnish Kk 62 light machine gun, the pistol grip is also used as a handle to charge the weapon.

Pistol grips are regarded as a defining feature in United States gun law. Pistol grips that protrude below the weapon but are not integrated with the shoulder stock (i.e. as part of a thumbhole stock) are currently regulated in some states and were regulated by the now-expired Federal Assault Weapons Ban.

Tools with pistol-style grips run the range from hand tools such as bar clamps and hand saws, to power tools such as electric drills and pneumatic surgical sternal saws.  Often the word "gun" appears in the name of pistol gripped tools such as the glue gun, caulking gun and nail gun. Spray painters and grinders also often include this feature for added precision control.

One of the reasons that pistol-style grips are so common in machinery is because it is possible to ergonomically position the operating controls for use with minimal hand movement.  For example, on self-loading rifles such as the AR-15 and M16 rifle, the user's grip hand can manipulate the trigger and magazine release with only the index finger, while using the thumb to control the safety or selector switch, all without needing to remove the palm from the grip.

References

Human–machine interaction
Firearm components